TSS Great Western was a passenger vessel built for the Great Western Railway in 1933.

History

She was built in 1933 to replace an earlier ship of the same name, which had operated the Fishguard to Rosslare route since 1902. She was launched on 21 November 1933 by Lady Cadman, wife of Sir John Cadman, a director of the Great Western Railway, and had an experimental type of coal firing with mechanical stokers and a forced draught system, intended to be more economical than oil.

From April to August in 1944, she acted as a troop ship, but returned to service and continued until 1966 when the service was abandoned

References

1933 ships
Passenger ships of the United Kingdom
Steamships of the United Kingdom
Ships built on the River Mersey
Ships of the Great Western Railway
Ships of British Rail